Felimida norrisi is a species of colorful sea slug, a dorid nudibranch, a marine gastropod mollusk in the family Chromodorididae.

Description
The body grows to a length of  60 mm.

Distribution
This species occurs in the Pacific Ocean from Baja California, Mexico to Costa Rica.

References

 Abbott R. T. (1974). American Seashells. The marine mollusca of the Atlantic and Pacific coast of North America. II edit. Van Nostrand, New York 663 p. + 24 pl: 
page(s): 355
 Debelius, H. & Kuiter, R.H. (2007) Nudibranchs of the world. ConchBooks, Frankfurt, 360 pp.  page(s): 180 
 Behrens D.W., Gosliner T.M. & Hermosillo A. (2009) A new species of dorid nudibranch (Mollusca) from the Revillagigedo Islands of the Mexican Pacific. Proceedings of the California Academy of Sciences ser. 4, 60(11): 423-429.
 Johnson R.F. & Gosliner T.M. (2012) Traditional taxonomic groupings mask evolutionary history: A molecular phylogeny and new classification of the chromodorid nudibranchs. PLoS ONE 7(4): e33479

Chromodorididae
Gastropods described in 1963